The 2020 interim government of Kyrgyzstan is the 25th government of Kyrgyzstan that was formed during the 2020 Kyrgyzstan protests which resulted in opposition groups seizing government buildings during the aftermath of the first 2020 parliamentary election. Sadyr Japarov was nominated as the acting Prime Minister by the MP's on 10 October 2020 who was approved by President Sooronbay Jeenbekov on 14 October which resulted in formation of a cabinet. The following day on 15 October, Jeenbekov stepped down from his post which resulted in Japarov becoming the acting president. This marked the first time in Kyrgyz history that someone served as President and PM at the same time.

On 1 July, the Kyrgyz Foreign Minister Ruslan Kazakbaev visited Azerbaijan. That same day, Kyrgyz Culture Minister Anar Karimov and the Egyptian Ambassador to Azerbaijan Adel Ibrahim Ahmed Ibrahim exchanged views on further cooperation on expanding ties in the cultural field.

Composition

References 

2020 in Kyrgyzstan
Cabinets established in 2020
2020 establishments in Kyrgyzstan